Havelock island, officially known as Swaraj Dweep, is one of the largest islands in Ritchie's Archipelago, to the east of Great Andaman within the Andaman Islands. It belongs to the South Andaman administrative district, part of the Indian union territory of Andaman and Nicobar Islands.

Etymology
Havelock Island was previously named after a British general, Sir Henry Havelock, who served in India.

In December 2018, it was renamed, by Prime Minister Narendra Modi, as Swaraj Island as a tribute to Subhas Chandra Bose. Bose had hoisted the Indian flag at Port Blair on 30 December 1943 and proclaimed the Andaman and Nicobar Islands as liberated from British rule. He had subsequently named Neil Island as Shaheed Dweep and Ross Island was renamed as Netaji Subhas Chandra Bose Dweep as well.

History
Swaraj Dweep is one of the few places that the administration of the Andaman and Nicobar Islands union territory of India has permitted and encouraged development of tourism, with a focus on promoting eco-tourism.

Swaraj Dweep avoided much of the devastation by the 2004 Indian Ocean earthquake and its resulting tsunami and there were no documented casualties.

There is a lighthouse at the northern point of the island, near Govinda Nagar, established in 2005.

On 30 December 2018, Prime Minister Narendra Modi announced that Havelock Island would be renamed as Swaraj Dweep.

Geography
The island belongs to the Ritchie's Archipelago and is located between Peel Island and Neil Island.

Administration
Politically, Swaraj Dweep is part of Port Blair taluk.

Demographics
The island's current population of 6,351 consists of mainly Bengali settlers. Many of these settlers have East Bengali origin as these people were given settlement by the Indian government after the Partition of India in 1947.

The six villages are:
 Govinda Nagar 2,940
 Vejoy Nagar (inc. Kalapathar) 1,099
 Shyam Nagar 856
 Krishna Nagar 719
 Radha Nagar 637
 Road between Shyam Nagar and Krishna Nagar 100

Beaches
Radhanagar Beach on the western coast, also known as Number 7 Beach, is one of the most popular beaches on Swaraj and was named "Best Beach in Asia" by Time in 2004. Radhanagar beach also bagged the prestigious blue flag certification in 2020. A Blue Flag beach is an eco-tourism model endeavouring to provide the tourists or beachgoers clean and hygienic bathing water, facilities, safe and healthy environment. Other notable beaches include Elephant Beach on the northwest coast and Vijay Nagar Beach (No. 5), Beach No. 3 and Beach No. 1 on the east coast. Kalapathar is another famous beach.

To reach Elephant beach one needs to take a boat from Swaraj Dweep jetty. Another way to reach Elephant beach is via trekking. The major 3 beaches at Swaraj Dweep are namely Radhanagar Beach, Elephant Beach and Kalapathar beach.

Transportation
The island can be reached from Port Blair by government-operated ferries and private cruises. There are also helicopter services.

A local bus connects the jetty and villages on an hourly circuit. Private ferries that sail to Swaraj Dweep are Makruzz, Green Ocean, Sea Link and ITT Majestic these cruises have different sailing time and schedule from Port Blair to Swaraj Dweep and from Neil Island to Swaraj Dweep. The ferry sailing to Swaraj is subject to weather conditions.

Within the island you can travel in a cab, a two wheeler or bus. The most convenient way is to take a cab or a two wheeler.

Travelers typically take the ferry service from Port Blair to Swaraj Dweep, Swaraj to Neil Island and Neil to Port Blair

Many properties are now available at Havelock Island that can be booked. From budget to luxury all options are available. The most preferred places to stay at Swaraj Dweep are Beach No.3, Beach No.5 and Beach No. 3. People prefer to stay closer to the beaches at Havelock Island.

Internet connectivity at Swaraj Dweep has improved since the undersea cable from Chennai to Port Blair has been laid. The internet connectivity in all the islands has improved. At Swaraj Dweep now high-speed internet is available. Airtel and BSNL are available at Swaraj.

Gallery

References

External links

 Havelock Island (Swaraj Dweep) at Andaman & Nicobar Tourism website

Cities and towns in South Andaman district
Ritchie's Archipelago
Islands of South Andaman district
Islands of the Andaman Sea
Tourist attractions in the Andaman and Nicobar Islands
Islands of India
Populated places in India
Islands of the Bay of Bengal